Hulan District is one of nine districts of the prefecture-level city of Harbin, the capital of Heilongjiang Province, Northeast China. It covers part of the northeastern suburbs. The district was approved to establish from the former Hulan County by the Chinese State Council on February 4, 2004. It borders Bayan County to the east, Bin County to the southeast, Daowai District to the south, and Songbei District to the southwest, as well as the prefecture-level city of Suihua to the northwest.

History
After World War II, the Hulan District was home of Manchukuo veterans who became homeless because they failed to conscript the newly People's Liberation Army.

Administrative divisions 
Hulan District is divided into 17 subdistricts, 7 towns and 3 townships. 
17 subdistricts
 Hulan, Lanhe, Yaobo,  Limin, Kangjin, Shuangjing, Jianshelu, Xueyuanlu, Zhangling, Shenjia, Nanjinglu, Yumin, Yutian, Yuqiang, Xiaoxiang, Gongyuanlu, Sandian
7 towns
 Erba, Shiren, Baikui, Fangtai, Lianhua, Dayong, Liye
3 townships
 Yanglin, Xubo, Mengjia

Climate

See also 
 Hulan River
 Tales of Hulan River, by Xiao Hong: a description of life in Hulan District, during the period 1910–1930.

References 

Hulan